Ibrahim ("Brima") Bazzy Kamara (born 7 May 1968 in Freetown) was a commander of the soldiers of the Sierra Leonean Armed Forces Revolutionary Council (AFRC) and in 2007 was convicted of committing war crimes and crimes against humanity in the Sierra Leone Civil War.

Kamara was born in the neighborhood of Wilberforce, in the west end of Freetown. In 1998, Kamara was invited by Johnny Paul Koroma to join the AFRC Supreme Council. In this capacity, Kamara was a commander of the AFRC and Revolutionary United Front forces that attacked civilians in the north, east, and centre of Sierra Leone in 1998 and in Freetown in January 1999.

Kamara was indicted on 7 March 2003, was arrested on 29 May 2003, and his trial before the Special Court for Sierra Leone began on 7 March 2005. He was tried with Alex Tamba Brima and Santigie Borbor Kanu. Kamara was found guilty of crimes against humanity and war crimes on 20 June 2007, including counts of murder, rape, forced labour, and the use of child soldiers. He and his codefendants' convictions were the first convictions for the Special Court for Sierra Leone and were also the first time anyone had been convicted of the international crime of using child soldiers. On 19 July 2007, Kamara was sentenced to 45 years' imprisonment. He is serving his sentence in Mpanga Prison in Rwanda.

Notes 

1968 births
Living people
People convicted by the Special Court for Sierra Leone
People indicted by the Special Court for Sierra Leone
Sierra Leonean military personnel
Sierra Leonean people convicted of war crimes
Sierra Leonean people convicted of crimes against humanity
Sierra Leonean people imprisoned abroad
Prisoners and detainees of Rwanda
People from Freetown